"" ("Anthem of Aragon") is the official anthem of the autonomous community of Aragon in Spain. Its music, based on the oldest Aragonese musical tradition, was written by Aragonese composer Antón García Abril, with lyrics written by Aragonese poets Ildefonso Manuel Gil, Ángel Guinda, Rosendo Tello and Manuel Vilas.

Its use was regulated by a 1989 Aragonese Act, which states that the Anthem of Aragon will be played in all relevant official public events organized by the community or other local-level Aragonese administrations. The Act also indicates that the Anthem can be sung in any of the languages of Aragon. However, the Act does not supply an official version of the lyrics in Aragonese or Catalan.

Another anthem, "Canto a la libertad", is often regarded as the de facto unofficial anthem of Aragon.

Lyrics

See also
 Anthems of the autonomous communities of Spain

References

Spanish anthems
Regional songs
Aragonese culture
Spanish-language songs
Year of song missing
1989 songs